Brian Harper (born 1959) is an American baseball player.

Brian Harper can also refer to:
Brian London (born Brian Harper, 1934–2021), English boxer
Brian Harper (priest) (born 1961), Irish priest
Brian Harper (engineer) (21st century), Australian civil engineer
 'Brian Harper, the pseudonym of writer Michael Prescott